Lust is an intense craving or drive that is directly associated with the thinking or fantasizing about one's desire, usually in a sexual way.

Lust may also refer to:

Lust (Lords of Acid album), 1991
Lust (Ambitious Lovers album), 1991
Lust (Michael Rother album), 1983
Lust (Jelinek novel), a 1989 novel by Austrian Nobel prize-winner Elfriede Jelinek
Lust (Ryman novel), a novel by Canadian writer Geoff Ryman
Lust (Fullmetal Alchemist), a character in the manga and anime series Fullmetal Alchemist
"Lust", a song by Tori Amos on her album To Venus and Back
"Lust" (Kendrick Lamar song), 2017
"Lust" (Lil Skies song), 2017
Lust (color), a shade of red
Lust (2010 film), an Egyptian film
Lust (2018 film), an Indian film
LUST, an acronym for Leaking Underground storage tank
Lustboy (born 1994), nickname of Ham Jang-sik, Korean League of Legends player

Surname
 Erika Lust, Swedish screenplay writer, director, producer and author
 Matthias Lust (born 1970), German football coach and a former player
 Ulli Lust (born 1967), Austrian cartoonist
 Victoria Lust (born 1989), English professional squash player